This list of cemeteries in Colorado includes currently operating, historical (closed for new interments), and defunct (graves abandoned or removed) cemeteries, columbaria, and mausolea which are historical and/or notable. It does not include pet cemeteries.

Bent County 
 Fort Lyon National Cemetery, near Las Animas

Boulder County 
 St. Vrain Church of the Brethren, Hygiene; NRHP-listed

Custer County 
 Silver Cliff Cemetery, near Silver Cliff

Denver County 
 Fairmount Cemetery, Denver
 Fairmount Mausoleum, Denver
 Fort Logan National Cemetery, Denver
 Riverside Cemetery, Denver; NRHP-listed

Douglas County
 Parker Cemetery, Parker

El Paso County 

 Crystal Valley Cemetery, Manitou Springs; NRHP-listed
 Evergreen Cemetery, Colorado Springs
 Fairview Cemetery, Colorado Springs
 Pikes Peak National Cemetery, near Colorado Springs
 United States Air Force Academy Cemetery, Colorado Springs; NRHP-listed

Jefferson County 

 Mount Olivet Cemetery, Wheat Ridge
 Tower of Memories mausoleum, Crown Hill Cemetery, Wheat Ridge; NRHP-listed

Larimer County 
 Grandview Cemetery, Fort Collins

Las Animas County 
 Our Lady of Guadalupe Church and Medina Cemetery, Medina Plaza; NRHP-listed

Pitkin County 
 Ute Cemetery, Aspen

See also
 List of cemeteries in the United States
 Pioneer cemetery

References

Colorado